El Tiro Gliderport , formally Marana Auxiliary Army Airfield No. 5 (Sahuaro Field), is marked on the Phoenix sectional chart is a non-towered private use gliderport  northwest of Tucson, Arizona, United States. The airport property is leased from the Bureau of Land Management and has been operated by the Tucson Soaring Club, Inc. (a chapter of the Soaring Society of America) since 1983.

Marana Auxiliary Army Airfield No. 5 (aka Sahuaro Field) was one of five auxiliary fields that served Marana Army Air Field (now Pinal Airpark) and is one of many Arizona World War II Army Airfields. Sahuaro Field first appeared on the Phoenix sectional chart in 1945. The airfield was originally described as a " square-shaped property having a  square asphalt landing mat." After World War II there is evidence of the airfield being used by the United States Air Force in 1957 for pilot training in North American T-6 Texan and T-28 Trojan aircraft. From 1958 the airport was reportedly abandoned until Tucson Soaring Club leased the property.

Facilities 

Old runways
 4L/23R , asphalt
 4R/23L , asphalt
 13L/32R , asphalt
 13R/32R , asphalt

Gallery

See also 
 Pinal Airpark
 Arizona World War II Army Airfields
 List of airports in Arizona

References

External links 

Airports in Pima County, Arizona
Aviation in Arizona